A list of comedy television series by country of origin.

Australia

Belgium

Bosnia and Herzegovina
 Viza za budućnost

Brazil

Canada

China
Number One Surprise

Croatia
Odmori se, zaslužio si
Zauvijek susjedi

Egypt

The Family of Mr Shalash
Miss Farah (2019–present)

France

Monster Buster Club

Greece

India

Jamaica 
 Hello World Jamaica (2004–2006)

Japan

New Zealand

Singapore
 All in All Alamelu (2012)
 Alli Rajam
 Chinna Papa Periya Papa (2003–2005, 2015–2016)
 Costly Mapillai (2000)
 Cuba and friends
 Dhinam Dhinam Deepavali (2007–2008)
 Galatta Kudumbam 1 & 2 (1999)
 House of media
 Khirushna Lattu Thinna Asaiya (2013–2014)
 Krishna Cottage 
 Madipakkam Madhavan (2013–2015)
 Mama Mapillai
 Masala Kudumbam
 Maya Basar
 My Name Is Mangamma (2012–2013)
 Naan Aval Illai
 Naduvulai Konsham Pakkathai Kanom
 Phua Chu Kang Pte. Ltd.
 Pondadi Deavai
 Pikachu and Friends
 RTSN Juniors
 Sabash Meera
 Sanmugam Kudumpathinar
 Singaram Theru
 Siri Siri Crazy
 Sirippulogam (2012)
 The Noose
 Under One Roof
 Vanthana Thanthana
 Veetukku Veedu Lutty

South Korea
 All My Love (2010–2011)

United Kingdom

#
 15 Storeys High (2002–2004)
 2point4 Children (1991–1999)

A

B

C

D

E

F

G

H

I

J
 Jam (2000)
 Jam & Jerusalem (2006–2009)
 Jeeves and Wooster (1990–1993)
 Joking Apart (1991–1995)

K

L

M

N

O

P

Q
 Q5 (1969–1970)

R

S

T

U
 The Uncle Floyd Show (1974–1995)
 Up Pompeii! (1969–1970)
 The Upper Hand (1990–1996)

V
 The Vicar of Dibley (1994–2007)
 Vicious (2013–2016)

W

Y
 Yes Minister (1980–1984) and Yes, Prime Minister, its sequel (1986–1988)
 You Must Be the Husband (1987–1988)
 You Rang, M'Lord? (1988–1993)
 The Young Ones (1982–1984)

United States

#

 @midnight (2013–2017)
 10 Items or Less (2006–2009)
 10 Things I Hate About You (2009–2010)
 100 Things to Do Before High School (2014–2016)
 1000 Ways to Die (2008–2012)
 2 Broke Girls (2011–2017)
 2 Stupid Dogs (1993–1995)
 30 Rock (2006–2013)
 3rd Rock from the Sun (1996–2001)
 8 Simple Rules (2002–2005)
 90 Bristol Court (1964–1965)
 9JKL (2017–2018)

A

B

C

D

E

F

G

H

I

J

K

L

M

N

O

P

Q
 Quark (1977–1978)
 The Quick Draw McGraw Show (1959–1961)
 Quintuplets (2004–2005)
 Quantico (2015–2018)

R

S

T

U
 Unbreakable Kimmy Schmidt (2015–2019)
 Uncle Grandpa (2013–2017)
 Undeclared (2001–2002)
 Unfabulous (2004–2007)
 Ugly Betty (2006–2010)
 Unikitty! (2017–2020)
 The United States of Tara (2009–2011)
 United We Fall (2020)

V
 Veep (2012–2019)
 The Venture Bros. (2003–2018)
 Veronica Mars (2004–2019)
 Veronica's Closet (1997–2000)
 Victorious (2010–2013)
 Viva Valdez (1976)

W

X
The X's (2005–2006)

Y
Yes, Dear (2000–2006)
The Yogi Bear Show (1961–1962)
Young & Hungry (2014–2018)
Young Sheldon (2017–present)
Your Pretty Face Is Going to Hell (2013–2019)
You're the Worst (2014–2019)

Z
Z Rock (2008–2009)
Zeke and Luther (2009–2012)
Zoey 101 (2005–2008)
Zombie College (2000–2001)

Co-productions
Angela Anaconda (1999–2001)
Arthur (1996–2022)
Clone High (2002–2003)
Darcy's Wild Life (2004–2006)
The Doozers (2013–2018)
Glenn Martin, DDS (2009–2011)
Johnny Test (2005–2014)
Let's Go Luna! (2018–2022)
The Magic School Bus (1994–1997)
Martha Speaks (2008–2014)
Molly of Denali (2019–present)
Mr. Meaty (2006–2009)
Nature Cat (2015–present)
Odd Squad (2014–2022)
Peep and the Big Wide World (2004–2011)
Postcards from Buster (2004–2012)
The Troop (2009–2013)
Undergrads (2001)
Welcome to the Wayne (2017–2019)
Wild Kratts (2011–present)
Zoboomafoo (1999–2001)

See also
 British comedy
 Comedy
 Comedy film
 Farce
 List of BBC sitcoms
 List of comedy-drama television series
 List of sketch comedy television series
 List of theatrical comedies
 List of radio comedies
 List of situation comedies
 List of teen sitcoms
 Lists of comedy films
 Sitcom

External links
 Classic British Sitcoms Forum
 The BBC Guide to Comedy
 The British Sitcom Guide - sitcom list

Comedies